The 2021–22 UCF Knights women's basketball team represented the University of Central Florida during the 2021–22 NCAA Division I basketball season. The Knights compete in Division I of the National Collegiate Athletic Association (NCAA) and the American Athletic Conference (The American). The Knights, in the program's 45th season of basketball, were led by sixth-year head coach Katie Abrahamson-Henderson, and play their home games at the Addition Financial Arena on the university's main campus in Orlando, Florida. The Knights finished their regular season 22–3 and were American Athletic Conference champions at 14–1, winning the conference tournament and an automatic bid to the 2022 NCAA Division I women's basketball tournament, where they defeated Florida in the first round before losing to UConn in the second round.

Roster

Schedule and results

|-
! colspan=12 style=| Non-conference regular season

|-
!colspan=9 style=| AAC regular season

|-
!colspan=9 style=|AAC Women's Tournament

|-
!colspan=9 style=|NCAA Women's Tournament

Rankings
2021–22 NCAA Division I women's basketball rankings

See also
 2021–22 UCF Knights men's basketball team

References

External links
 Official Team Website

UCF
UCF Knights women's basketball seasons
UICF Knights
UICF Knights
UCF